The 1993–94 Wisconsin Badgers men's basketball team represented the University of Wisconsin–Madison as a member of the Big Ten Conference during the 1993–94 NCAA Division I men's basketball season. Head coach Stu Jackson completed his second and final season coaching the Badgers. The team played its home games in Madison, Wisconsin at the Wisconsin Field House. Wisconsin finished the season 18-11, 8-10 in Big Ten play to finish in seventh place. The Badgers earned an at-large bid to the NCAA tournament as a No. 9 seed in the West Region, defeating No. 8 seed Cincinnati before losing to No. 1 seed Missouri in the Round of 32.

Season summary 
A breakthrough season for Wisconsin culminated in its first NCAA Tournament appearance since 1947. Highly-touted freshman center Rashard Griffith joined fellow Chicago natives Tracy Webster and preseason All-American Michael Finley to form arguably the most talented trio of teammates in program history.

Though Jackson's reputation was as an uptempo coach, Wisconsin adjusted its style with Griffith on the court. The Badgers posted an 8-1 record when they scored at least 85 points, but generally played at a slower pace than the previous season. The differences from 1992-93 were most notable during conference play. Wisconsin averaged four fewer points-per-game (69.8), back near the bottom of the league. But it countered with a stingy defense that allowed 70.8 points-per-game to Big Ten foes, ranking just behind league-leader Michigan State. This was an eight-point improvement from the previous season's defense (78.9). The team led the conference in field goal defense (.428) and blocks, with 79. Webster paced the league with 40 steals and Griffith led in blocks-per-game (2.57), swatting 36 in only 14 Big Ten games. 

Offensively, a prolific three-point shooting offense led by Finley, Webster and Andy Kilbride shot and made more from long distance than any other Big Ten school, though it only converted on 34.9 percent as a team.

Griffith debuted in spectacular fashion in the season opener versus UW-Milwaukee, posting 27 points, 12 rebounds and six assists in 32 minutes of a 106-84 win. The team scored 100 points the next game as well, a win at Loyola Marymount. The Badgers went undefeated through the non-conference schedule, which included a road win over reigning SWC champion Texas Tech and a home win over ranked rival Marquette. In early January, 11-0 Wisconsin ascended to No. 12 in the country, its highest ranking ever in the AP Poll, following a home victory over Ohio State.

A visit to No. 18 Minnesota the next game resulted in the team's first loss, 90-53. Wisconsin bounced back to beat Glenn Robinson and No. 9 Purdue, 75-69, in a tense matchup of Top 15 teams. Then the Badgers began to succumb to the rigors of the Big Ten. 

Two weeks later, Griffith injured his knee and missed two games, starting with a February 2nd rematch with Michigan State. Led by Finley's 32 points, 11 rebounds and five assists, the Badgers blew out the Spartans, 87-62, to move to 14-3 (5-3) on the season. However, Griffith would miss two more games with back spasms while the team slipped to 6-6 in conference. Minnesota remained a thorn in its side, blowing out Wisconsin for a second time. The Gophers outscored the Badgers 199-132 in two games.

Riding a four-game losing streak into a matchup with the Fab Five and No. 3 Michigan at the Field House, Wisconsin responded with a resounding 71-58 victory on March 2, 1994. The monumental win essentially saved the team's NCAA Tournament aspirations. The unranked Badgers dropped two of their final regular season games on the road to finish with a losing conference record, yet still received a bid to the Big Dance.

Postseason 
Wisconsin earned a No. 9 seed in the NCAA Tournament's West Region and faced No. 8 seed Cincinnati in a first round game in Ogden, Utah. Finley and Griffith pitched in 22 points apiece and the Badgers got nine points in 16 minutes from freshman Jalil Roberts to outlast the Bearcats, 80-72. "We were fighting uphill all the way," Cincinnati head coach Bob Huggins said following the game.  

In the second round, the team lost a fast-paced duel to Missouri, the West Region's No. 1 seed, 109-96. Finley scored a career-high 36 points, but the usually dependable Wisconsin defense was torched by the Tigers' 68 percent shooting. Webster added a season-best 27 points to seven assists and no turnovers in his final game as a Badger.

Awards and honors 
All-American
 Michael Finley - 2nd team (Basketball Times), honorable mention (AP and USBWA)

All-Big Ten
 Michael Finley - 2nd team (coaches and media)
 Tracy Webster - Honorable mention (coaches and media)

Big Ten Player of the Week
 Michael Finley - Week of January 10, 1994

Roster 

 *transferred to Div. II North Dakota after fall semester

Schedule 

|-
!colspan=9 style=""| Regular Season

|-
!colspan=9 style=""|NCAA tournament

Rankings

Player statistics

Records and trivia 
Tracy Webster set a Wisconsin single season record for steals, with 69. The senior's assist-to-turnover ratio of 2.38 during the 1993-94 season topped Mike Heineman's nine-year-old record and stood for five more seasons until Mike Kelley's 1998-99 season. 

Webster left school as the program's all-time leader in career assists (501) and steals (183), compiling those numbers in just three seasons. His assist total remains a Wisconsin record.

References 

Wisconsin Badgers men's basketball seasons
Wisconsin
Wisconsin
Wisconsin Badgers men's b
Wisconsin Badgers men's b